United Nations Security Council Resolution 230 was adopted unanimously on December 7, 1966; after examining the application of Barbados for membership in the United Nations, the Council recommended to the General Assembly that Barbados be admitted.

See also
 Foreign relations of Barbados
 Permanent Representative of Barbados to the United Nations
 List of countries that have gained independence from the United Kingdom
 List of United Nations Security Council Resolutions 201 to 300 (1965–1971)

References
Text of the Resolution at undocs.org

External links
 

 0230
foreign relations of Barbados
1966 in Barbados
 0230
 0230
December 1966 events